Otto, Count of Ballenstedt, called Otto the Rich ( – 9 February 1123), was the first Ascanian prince to call himself count of Anhalt, and was also briefly named duke of Saxony. He was the father of Albert the Bear, who later conquered Brandenburg from the Slavs and called himself its first margrave.

Otto was the eldest son of Adalbert II, Count of Ballenstedt and Adelaide of Weimar-Orlamünde, daughter of Otto I, Margrave of Meissen. After the death of his father-in-law, Magnus, Duke of Saxony, in 1106, Otto inherited a significant part of Magnus' properties, and hoped to succeed him as duke. However, Lothar of Supplinburg was named duke in his stead. In 1112, after Lothar had been banned, Otto was appointed duke of Saxony by Emperor Henry V; but in the same year, he came into a dispute with the emperor and was stripped of his ducal title. He now allied himself with Lothar, and helped Lothar defeat Hoyer I, Count of Mansfeld, who had been named duke of Saxony by the Emperor, in 1115.

Otto conquered the areas around Zerbst and Salzwedel from Slavs, and maintained Lothar's support once Lothar became king in 1125. He also claimed the County of Weimar-Orlamünde, of which his mother was the heir.

Family
Otto married Eilika, the daughter of Magnus, Duke of Saxony, before 1095. They had the following children:

 Albert the Bear (1100–1170)
 Adelaide (died after 1139), married Henry IV, Count of Stade, and in 1139, Werner, Count of Osterburg

References

Sources

1070s births
1123 deaths
Year of birth uncertain

Counts of Anhalt

Dukes of Saxony
12th-century Saxon people